Ndola District is a district of Zambia, located in Copperbelt Province. The capital lies at Ndola. As of the 2000 Zambian Census, the district had a population of 374,757 people.

Constituencies 
Ndola District is divided into four constituencies, namely Ndola Central, Kabushi, Bwana Mkubwa and Chifubu.

References

Districts of Copperbelt Province
Ndola